The Federal Democratic Republican Party (PRDF) was a Spanish political party founded in 1868 during the Glorious Revolution that was active until 1912. Its ideology was federal republicanism and progressivism.

History 
In 1868, the left-wing and federalist republican wing of the Democrats established the Democratic Federal Republican to achieve a secular and democratic federal republic in Spain.

The PRDF was the ruling party during the First Spanish Republic (1873–1874), but it failed in its goal of consolidating a republican form of government and in establishing federalism. After the fall of the First Republic, it became a minority party, although retaining some influence in the republican movement during the Restoration.

See also 
 Liberalism and radicalism in Spain
 List of political parties in Spain

References 

 Jorge Vilches (2001). Progreso y Libertad. El Partido Progresista en la Revolución Liberal Española. Madrid: Alianza Editorial. .
 Carmen Pérez Roldán (2001). El Partido Republicano Federal 1868-1874. Madrid: Endymion Editorial. .

1868 establishments in Spain
1912 disestablishments in Spain
Defunct political parties in Spain
Defunct liberal political parties
Liberal parties in Spain
Political parties disestablished in 1912
Political parties established in 1868
Progressive parties
Radical parties
Republican parties in Spain
Secularism in Spain
Social liberal parties